High Noon is the fifth and third major-label studio album by American country music artist Jerrod Niemann. It was released on March 25, 2014 via Sea Gayle Music and Arista Nashville. The album includes Jerrod's second number one hit "Drink to That All Night," as well as a collaboration with Colt Ford.

Critical reception

High Noon received generally positive reviews from music critics. At Country Weekly, Jon Freeman graded the album an A, saying that on the release Niemann "doubles down on the electric approaches he has long favored and comes up with a bag full of surprises." In addition, Freeman writes that "It'll no doubt sound great at every cookout this summer, without sounding like anything else." Stephen Thomas Erlewine of AllMusic rated the album two out of five stars, saying that "Despite the cowboy stance of its title, there isn't much swagger on High Noon: it's all slick, smooth and rather slow; so mellow that even the odes to "Day Drinkin'" and "Beach Baby" barely quicken the pulse." Furthermore, Erlewine states that "Coming after the untrammeled Free the Music, this conservatism is certainly a disappointment but the crushing thing is, High Noon isn't merely cautious, it's boring." At USA Today, Brian Mansfield rated the album two-and-a-half stars out of four, writing that the "Single Drink to That All Night may be country's response to EDM, but Niemann's songs hold up even with stripped-down arrangements [...] Except, maybe, for the one that rhymes 'donkey' with 'honky-tonky.'" Gary Graff of The Oakland Press rated the album two-and-a-half stars out of four, stating that the release is "aptly titled" on which he's "definitely on target with what’s working in country these days, making Niemann at least a distinctive voice in a pack that’s rapidly towing the same line." At Roughstock, Matt Bjorke rated the album four-and-a-half stars out of five, and according to him the album "should solidify Niemann as a radio star" because the release comes with "plenty of hits" that are "the kind of songs that should be accepted by radio programmers and fans alike, especially since even when he’s featuring interesting melodies, the songs never feel like they are dressed up pop or rock songs."

Track listing

Personnel

 Tom Bukovac – electric guitar
 Smith Curry – steel guitar
 Eric Darken – percussion
 Will Doughty – keyboards, piano
 Fred Eltringham – drums
 Colt Ford – vocals on "She's Fine"
 Paul Franklin – steel guitar
 Derek George – background vocals
 Charlie Judge – keyboards
 Troy Lancaster – electric guitar
 Chris McHugh – drums
 Rob McNelley – acoustic guitar, electric guitar
 Jerry McPherson – bouzouki, electric guitar
 Phil Madeira – lap steel guitar
 Blair Masters – keyboards, programming 
 Lance Miller – background vocals
 Greg Morrow – drums
 Jerrod Niemann – acoustic guitar, lead vocals, background vocals
 Brad Passans – background vocals
 Danny Rader – accordion, banjo, bouzouki, dobro, acoustic guitar, mandolin
 Adam Shoenfeld – electric guitar
 Jimmie Lee Sloas – bass guitar, piano, ukulele
 Tim Teague – electric guitar
 Russell Terrell – background vocals
 David Tolliver – animal sounds, background vocals
 Ilya Toshinsky – banjo, acoustic guitar, mandolin

Chart performance
The album debuted at No. 18 on the Billboard 200, and No. 3 on the Top Country Albums charts, with sales of 14,000 on its first week.  The album has sold 60,000 copies in the US as of August 2014.

Weekly charts

Year-end charts

Singles

References

2014 albums
Jerrod Niemann albums
Arista Records albums
Albums produced by Jimmie Lee Sloas